Pitogo, officially the Municipality of Pitogo (Subanen: Benwa Pitogo; Chavacano: Municipalidad de Pitogo), is a 4th class municipality in the province of Zamboanga del Sur, Philippines. According to the 2020 census, it has a population of 27,516 people.

Geography

Barangays
Pitogo is politically subdivided into 15 barangays.
	Balabawan
	Balong-balong
	Colojo
	Liasan
	Liguac
	Limbayan
	Lower Paniki-an
	Matin-ao
	Panubigan
	Poblacion (Pitogo)
	Punta Flecha
	Sugbay Dos
	Tongao
	Upper Paniki-an
	San Isidro

Climate

Demographics

Economy

References

External links
 Pitogo Profile at PhilAtlas.com
 [ Philippine Standard Geographic Code]
Philippine Census Information

Municipalities of Zamboanga del Sur